Canopy Flyer is a roller coaster attraction located at Universal Studios Singapore. It is a family-friendly outdoor attraction. The ride travels above most of the Lost World themed area, but also gives riders a bird's-eye view of the park.

Summary

Riders enter the queue and zig-zag up to the loading platform on the second lever and board cars suspended on a track which hold four guests each, two front-facing, and two back-facing. As the car moves up the lift hill, the "Theme from Jurassic Park" music plays from the speakers located along the hill. The cars go up a high distance in the air, and travel around the Jurassic Park-themed area including a 360-degree turn over the ride Jurassic Park Rapids Adventure before returning to the station.

References

External links
 Official Webpage
 Universal Studios Singapore

Southern Islands
Sentosa
Tourist attractions in Singapore
Landmarks in Singapore
Jurassic Park in amusement parks
Roller coasters introduced in 2010
Roller coasters operated by Universal Parks & Resorts
Roller coasters in Singapore
Universal Studios Singapore
Universal Parks & Resorts attractions by name
2010 establishments in Singapore

fr:Universal Studios Singapore